Multidrug resistance-associated protein 5 is a protein that in humans is encoded by the ABCC5 gene.

Function 

The protein encoded by this gene is a member of the superfamily of ATP-binding cassette (ABC) transporters. ABC proteins transport various molecules across extra- and intra-cellular membranes. ABC genes are divided into seven distinct subfamilies (ABC1, MDR/TAP, MRP, ALD, OABP, GCN20, White). This protein is a member of the MRP subfamily which is involved in multi-drug resistance. This protein functions in the cellular export of its substrate, cyclic nucleotides. This export contributes to the degradation of phosphodiesterases and possibly an elimination pathway for cyclic nucleotides. Studies show that this protein provides resistance to thiopurine anticancer drugs, 6-mercaptopurine and thioguanine, and the anti-HIV drug 9-(2-phosphonylmethoxyethyl)adenine. This protein may be involved in resistance to thiopurines in acute lymphoblastic leukemia and antiretroviral nucleoside analogs in HIV-infected patients. Alternative splicing of this gene has been detected; however, the complete sequence and translation initiation site is unclear.

Interactive pathway map

See also 
 ATP-binding cassette transporter

References

Further reading

External links 
 
 
 

ATP-binding cassette transporters